Mala Dolga Noga is a former settlement in the Municipality of Litija in central Slovenia. It is now part of the village of Zgornja Jevnica. The area is part of the traditional region of Upper Carniola and is now included with the rest of the municipality in the Central Sava Statistical Region.

Geography
Mala Dolga Noga is located in the eastern part of Zgornja Jevnica, on a road climbing toward Bulantin Peak from the valley of Jevnica Creek.

History
In figures encompassing all of what is now Zgornja Jevnica, Mala Dolga Noga had a population of 118 living in 14 houses in 1880, and 103 living in 15 houses in 1900. Mala Dolga Noga was annexed by Jevnica in 1953, ending its existence as a separate settlement.  When Zgornja Jevnica became a separate settlement in 1989, Mala Dolga Noga was assigned to its territory.

References

External links

Mala Dolga Noga on Geopedia

Populated places in the Municipality of Litija